Darwinia neildiana, commonly known as fringed bell, is a species of flowering plant in the family Myrtaceae and is endemic to the south-west of Western Australia. Flowering occurs between August and December. The species was first formally described by Victorian Government botanist Ferdinand von Mueller in 1875 in Fragmenta Phytographiae Australiae. The specific epithet (neildiana) honours James Edward Neild. It grows among rocks in the Avon Wheatbelt, Geraldton Sandplains and Swan Coastal Plain biogeographic regions of south-western Western Australia.

References

neildiana
Endemic flora of Western Australia
Rosids of Western Australia
Myrtales of Australia
Taxa named by Ferdinand von Mueller